Ricardo Argentina Bussi (Kansas City, 24 April 1964) is an American-born Argentinian politician. He had been National Senator representing Tucumán Province and provincial deputy of Tucumán. 

He was born in Kansas City, where his father Antonio Domingo Bussi was taking a course in the United States Army Command and General Staff College. He is graduated at Law in the University of Belgrano.

He started his career as defender of his father, accused of crimes against humanity and working along his father who was elected Governor of Tucuman in the 90's. He was elected as National Deputy in 1997 to 2003 and the Senator until 2007, as part of Fuerza Republicana, a party created by his father and now he is leading.

References

1964 births
Living people
Politicians from Kansas City, Missouri
Members of the Argentine Senate for Tucumán
Members of the Argentine Chamber of Deputies elected in Tucumán
Members of the Legislature of Tucumán